Oliver Hassencamp (1921–1988) was a German writer and actor.

Selected filmography

Film adaptations 
, directed by Franz Peter Wirth (1963, based on the novel Bekenntnisse eines möblierten Herrn)

Screenwriter 
 The False Adam (dir. Géza von Cziffra, 1955)
  (dir. Géza von Cziffra, 1956)
 Münchner Lach- und Schießgesellschaft (dir. Sammy Drechsel, 1956–1959, TV series, 6 episodes)
 A Woman for Life (dir. Wolfgang Liebeneiner, 1960)
 You Don't Shoot at Angels (dir. Rolf Thiele, 1960) — (based on a play by Miguel Mihura)
 Girl from Hong Kong (dir. Franz Peter Wirth, 1961) — (based on a novel by )
  (dir. Franz Peter Wirth, 1963)
 Hast du Töne, Papa? (dir. Wolfgang Becker, 1963, TV film)
 Ninotschka (dir. , 1965, TV film) — (remake of Ninotchka)
 Der Vogelhändler (dir. , 1968, TV film) — (based on the operetta Der Vogelhändler)
 Schaukelstuhl: Pension Schicksal (dir. , 1978, TV series, 6 episodes)

Actor 
 Hello, Fraulein! (1949) - René
 They Call It Love (1953) - Torgler
 Jonny Saves Nebrador (1953)
 Fireworks (1954) - (uncredited)
 Conchita and the Engineer (1954)
 A Girl from Paris (1954)
 Heroism after Hours (1955) - Anton Hirsemenzel (segment "Romeo und Julia auf dem Tandem")
 Jackboot Mutiny (1955) - Oberst Möllendorf
 The Double Husband (1955) - Fernando Gonzales
 Bei der blonden Kathrein (1959)
  (1964) - Professor Bindinger
 Aunt Frieda (1965) - Professor Bindinger
 Zur Hölle mit den Paukern (1968, part 1) - Dr. Priehl (final film role)

References

Bibliography 
 Goble, Alan. The Complete Index to Literary Sources in Film. Walter de Gruyter, 1999.

External links 
 

1921 births
1988 deaths
German male writers
German male screenwriters
German male film actors
People from Rastatt
Film people from Baden-Württemberg
20th-century German screenwriters